The 1985 Los Angeles Rams season was the franchise's 48th season in the National Football League and their 40th in the Greater Los Angeles Area.

In the playoffs, the Rams shut out the Dallas Cowboys 20–0 in the Divisional playoffs, advancing to the NFC Championship Game, but were shutout themselves by the eventual Super Bowl champion Chicago Bears 0–24. Eric Dickerson rushed for 1,234 yards in 1985 while missing the first two games while in a contract dispute. He missed the Pro Bowl for the first time in his short NFL career. He did, however, go on to rush for a playoff record 248 yards against the Dallas Cowboys in post-season play.

It was also the last time the Rams would win an NFC West divisional title when based in Los Angeles until 2017, and the last NFC West title until 1999 while they were in St. Louis.

Offseason

NFL Draft

Personnel

Staff

Roster

Regular season

Schedule

Game summaries

Week 1

Rams overcame 2 touchdown passes by John Elway with a late comeback led by "old" rookie QB Dieter Brock, who passed for 174 yards and a touchdown in his first NFL start. Backup RB Charles White ran for the winning touchdown in place of holdout Eric Dickerson.

Week 2

Rams defense sacked Randall Cunningham 5 times and picked off 4 passes and White ran for 144 yards and a touchdown.  Henry Ellard added an 80-yard punt return touchdown.

Week 3

Dickerson celebrated the end of his holdout by rushing for 150 yards and 3 touchdowns in this Monday Night matchup.

Week 4

Rams continued to dominate on defense and Brock passed for two touchdowns.

Week 5

Rams stayed unbeaten despite being outgained in yards 306–188.

Week 6

In a nip-and-tuck game, the Rams had two interception return touchdowns in the second half, by LB Carl Ekern and the winning touchdown by CB Leroy Irvin.

Week 7

Dickerson ran for a touchdown and Mike Lansford kicked three FG's. Rams' opportunistic defense intercepted Todd Blackledge six times.  Brock passed for only 68 yards.

Week 8

Rams were knocked from the unbeaten ranks at home as their offensive failures came back to haunt them.  Joe Montana passed for 3 touchdowns and led the 49ers to a 28–0 lead.  Brock passed for 344 yards (most of them late) and two late touchdowns.

Week 9

Rams were totally dominant at home as Brock passed for 2 touchdowns and Dickerson (108 yards rushing) and White each had a touchdown run.  Rams picked off 3 passes and had nine QB sacks.

Week 10

Giants fought back from a 16–7 early 2nd half deficit behind 2 touchdown runs by Joe Morris.

Week 11

Surprising blowout by the 1–9 Falcons behind three rushing touchdowns by Gerald Riggs and a Falcons' defense that held the Rams to only 45 yards rushing.

Week 12

Dickerson had 150 yards and a touchdown, but the real hero was Olympic sprinter-turned-WR Ron Brown.  Brown returned two kickoffs for touchdowns and caught a touchdown pass.

Week 13

Saints got their revenge for the earlier blowout by sacking Brock nine times and recovering 3 fumbles.  Bobby Hebert passed for a touchdown and LB Jack Del Rio returned a fumble for another. || Louisiana Superdome

Week 14

    
    
    
    
    
    
    
    

In this road Monday Night matchup, the 49ers looked to be in control until Henry Ellard scored on a tipped pass and CB Gary Green returned an interception for the winning points.  Montana passed for 328 yards and 3 touchdowns.
The Rams clinched a playoff spot with the win.

Week 15

Brock picked the right time to have his best game as a Ram as the Rams clinched their first NFC West Division crown since 1979. Brock passed for 4 touchdowns, Dickerson ran for 124 yards and two more, and the Rams rolled up 425 yards of offense.

Week 16

In a somewhat lackluster performance at home on Monday Night, the Rams could only muster two FG's and Brock was sacked 6 times.

Standings

Statistics

Passing

Rushing

Receiving

Playoffs

Divisional

Running back Eric Dickerson led the Rams to a victory by scoring two touchdowns and recording a playoff record 248 rushing yards. After the first half ended with a 3–0 Los Angeles lead, Dickerson scored on a 55-yard touchdown run early in the third period. On the ensuing kickoff, Kenny Duckett fumbled, and the ball was recovered by Vince Newsome to set up kicker Mike Lansford's second field goal. In the fourth period, Tony Hunter recovered a fumbled punt to set up Dickerson's 40-yard rushing touchdown.  The Rams' defense dominated the Cowboys' offense all afternoon as the Cowboys never got inside the Rams' 20-yard-line. This was the last home playoff game for the Rams in Los Angeles until 2017. This was also the last playoff game in which Tom Landry coached.

Conference Championship

The Bears defense dominated the game by limiting Rams running back Eric Dickerson to 46 yards rushing, and holding quarterback Dieter Brock to just 10 completions out of 31 pass attempts for 66 passing yards. Los Angeles only gained 130 yards of total offense. The Rams had a chance to get back in the game as they got inside the Bears' 15-yard line in the waning moments of the first half, but poor play calling and clock management, as well as a controversial call by the officials on the last play of the half, resulted in the clock running out.  Officials' ability to review plays (via instant replay) was not made available until the following season.

Awards and records

Milestones
Gary Jeter, NFL Comeback Player of Year.

See also
Other Anaheim–based teams in 1985
California Angels (Anaheim Stadium)
 1985 California Angels season

References

External links
 1985 Los Angeles Rams at Pro-Football-Reference.com

Los Angeles Rams
Los Angeles Rams seasons
NFC West championship seasons
Los Ang